John Culkin may refer to:
 John M. Culkin, American academic, media scholar and critic
 John Culkin (hurler), Irish hurler